The Autovía A-49 is a major highway in Andalusia, Spain. It starts on the ring road of Seville and heads west with a spur south A-483 to Almonte, the Costa de la Luz and the Doñana National Park.  The road crosses the Rio Tinto and the Odiel river north of Huelva and ends on the Portugal–Spain border 133 km west of Seville where it connects to the A22 motorway (Portugal) on the Guadiana International Bridge over the Guadiana River. It is also European route E1.

References

External links 
 From Spain A-49 to Portugal A-22

A-49
A-49